Jomfru Ane Gade (English: Virgin Anne's Street), in Aalborg, is a well known street in the northern part of Jutland in Denmark. It has gained popularity for the restaurants and pubs lining both sides of the street. It represents one of the longest continuous stretches of restaurants and bars in Denmark, only surpassed by a few areas in Aarhus and Copenhagen. On warm summer evenings, the terraces and restaurants fill up and then, as night falls, crowds of young people walk the street until they finally end up in one of the many discothèques.

History
The street dates back at least until the end of the 16th century, apparently named after Ane Viffert who in 1568 lived in nearby Skavegade. She is said to have been a nun at Ø Kloster on Limfjorden. For the next 200 years, the street housed the homes of several merchants. Some of their half-timbered houses can still be seen.

The first restaurant, the Gaslight, was opened in May 1967. As a result of its success, the Fyrtøjet opened the following year. By the end of the 1970s, there were another 10 pubs and restaurants, and by 1992, there were 26.

References

Streets in Denmark
Tourist attractions in Aalborg
Restaurant districts and streets